Amisk is a village in east central Alberta, Canada.

The site was surveyed by the Canadian Pacific Railway in 1906. That same year settlers from the United States, Scandinavia and Great Britain arrived. The first general store was built in 1907, and the school went up in 1916. Amisk boasts the oldest registered public library in rural Alberta.

Demographics

In the 2016 Census of Population conducted by Statistics Canada, the Village of Amisk recorded a population of 204 living in 84 of its 103 total private dwellings, a  change from its 2011 population of 207.

See also
Amisk (disambiguation)
List of communities in Alberta
List of villages in Alberta

References

External links 

1956 establishments in Alberta
Villages in Alberta